Andrey Belokrinkin (born 26 November 1946) is a Soviet alpine skier. He competed in three events at the 1968 Winter Olympics.

References

1946 births
Living people
Soviet male alpine skiers
Olympic alpine skiers of the Soviet Union
Alpine skiers at the 1968 Winter Olympics
Sportspeople from Nizhny Novgorod